German submarine U-966 was a Type VIIC U-boat of the German Navy (Kriegsmarine) during World War II.

She was ordered on 5 June 1941, and was laid down on 1 May 1942 at Blohm & Voss, Hamburg, as yard number 166. She was launched on 14 January 1943 and commissioned under the command of Oberleutnant zur See Eckehard Wolf on 4 March 1943.

Design
German Type VIIC submarines were preceded by the shorter Type VIIB submarines. U-966 had a displacement of  when at the surface and  while submerged. She had two shafts and two  propellers.

U-966 was fitted with five  torpedo tubes (four fitted at the bow and one at the stern), fourteen torpedoes or 26 TMA mines, one  SK C/35 naval gun, 220 rounds, and one twin  C/30 anti-aircraft gun. The boat had a complement of 44 to 52 men.

Service history
On 10 November 1943, U-966 was attacked by an RAF Wellington of 612 Squadron/B and then US Navy B-24 Liberators of squadrons VB-103 and VB-110.

The submarine headed for the neutral Spanish coast at full speed but at 13:54 BZ774/D attacked her with wing-mounted SAP60 semi-armour piercing rocket projectiles (RPs).

Several of the RPs failed to function, and the Czechoslovak aircrew was unable to see any effects on the target from those that did. But U-966 slowed to an estimated six to eight knots, and then within  of the Spanish coast she slowed to two knots before running aground. 42 of her 50 crew survived. They scuttled her in the Bay of Biscay off O Porto de Bares, Galicia, Spain, after several depth charge attacks badly damaged her, then took to their dinghies and were interned in Spain.

The wreckage was found in various locations near Punta de Estaca de Bares by a team of three Spanish divers in June 2018.

References

Bibliography

External links

1943 ships
German Type VIIC submarines
Maritime incidents in November 1943
Ships built in Hamburg
U-boats commissioned in 1943
World War II shipwrecks in the Atlantic Ocean
World War II submarines of Germany